Luddite is an EP by Grotus, released in 1992 by Spirit Music Industries.

Release and reception
In writing for AllMusic, critic Ned Raggett said, "finding its own way around industrial/rock fusions without simply recreating Ministry or Nine Inch Nails, the foursome explores grinding rhythms without an eye to either thrash metal or dancefloors, Lars Fox's roared vocals calling the tune (or lack thereof)." He awarded it three stars, concluding that "Luddite makes for a good slice of Grotus at its pre-major-label peak." Trouser Press noted that the music benefited by possessing a greater variance in composition structure and tighter focus in musicianship, helping to reinforce the band's message.

Track listing

Personnel 
Adapted from the Luddite liner notes.

Grotus
 Bruce Boyd – drums
 John Carson – bass guitar, keyboards, sampler
 Lars Fox – vocals, sampler
 Adam Tanner – sampler, keyboards, guitar, 6-string bass guitar

Production and additional personnel
 Grotus – production
 Dan Poppe – executive producer
 Damien Rasmussen – production, engineering
 Frank Wiedemann – photography, design

Release history

References

External links 
 

1992 EPs
Grotus albums
Alternative Tentacles EPs